Medieval literature is a broad subject, encompassing essentially all written works available in Europe and beyond during the Middle Ages (that is, the one thousand years from the fall of the Western Roman Empire ca. AD 500 to the beginning of the Renaissance in the 14th, 15th or 16th century, depending on country).  The literature of this time was composed of religious writings as well as secular works. Just as in modern literature, it is a complex and rich field of study, from the utterly sacred to the exuberantly profane, touching all points in-between.  Works of literature are often grouped by place of origin, language, and genre.

Languages
Outside of Europe, medieval literature was written in Ethiopic, Syriac, Coptic, Japanese, Chinese, and Arabic, among many other languages.

In Western Europe, Latin was the common language for medieval writing, since Latin was the language of the Roman Catholic Church, which dominated Western and Central Europe, and since the Church was virtually the only source of education. This was the case even in some parts of Europe that were never Romanized.

In Eastern Europe, the influence of the Eastern Roman Empire and the Eastern Orthodox Church made Greek and Old Church Slavonic the dominant written languages.

In Europe the common people used their respective vernaculars. A few examples, such as the Old English Beowulf, the Middle High German Nibelungenlied, the Medieval Greek Digenis Acritas, the Old East Slavic Tale of Igor's Campaign, and the Old French Chanson de Roland, are well known to this day. Although the extant versions of these epics are generally considered the works of individual (but anonymous) poets, there is no doubt that they are based on their peoples' older oral traditions. Celtic traditions have survived in the lais of Marie de France, the Mabinogion and the Arthurian cycles. Another host of vernacular literature has survived in the Old Norse literature and more specifically in the saga literature of Iceland.

Anonymity
A notable amount of medieval literature is anonymous. This is not only due to the lack of documents from a period, but also due to an interpretation of the author's role that differs considerably from the romantic interpretation of the term in use today. Medieval authors often deeply respected the classical writers and the Church Fathers and tended to re-tell and embellish stories they had heard or read rather than invent new stories. And even when they did, they often claimed to be handing down something from an auctor instead. From this point of view, the names of the individual authors seemed much less important, and therefore many important works were never attributed to any specific person.

Types of writing

Religious
Theological works were the dominant form of literature typically found in libraries during the Middle Ages. Catholic clerics were the intellectual center of society in the Middle Ages, and it is their literature that was produced in the greatest quantity.

Countless hymns survive from this time period (both liturgical and paraliturgical).  The liturgy itself was not in fixed form, and numerous competing missals set out individual conceptions of the order of the mass.  Religious scholars such as Anselm of Canterbury, Thomas Aquinas, and Pierre Abélard wrote lengthy theological and philosophical treatises, often attempting to reconcile the teachings of the Greek and Roman pagan authors with the doctrines of the Church.  Hagiographies, or "lives of the saints", were also frequently written, as an encouragement to the devout and a warning to others.

The Golden Legend of Jacobus de Voragine reached such popularity that, in its time, it was reportedly read more often than the Bible.  Francis of Assisi was a prolific poet, and his Franciscan followers frequently wrote poetry themselves as an expression of their piety. Dies Irae and Stabat Mater are two of the most powerful Latin poems on religious subjects. Goliardic poetry (four-line stanzas of satiric verse) was an art form used by some clerics to express dissent.  The only widespread religious writing that was not produced by clerics were the mystery plays: growing out of simple tableaux re-enactments of a single Biblical scene, each mystery play became its village's expression of the key events in the Bible.  The text of these plays was often controlled by local guilds, and mystery plays would be performed regularly on set feast-days, often lasting all day long and into the night.

During the Middle Ages, the Jewish population of Europe also produced a number of outstanding writers. Maimonides, born in Cordoba, Spain, and Rashi, born in Troyes, France, are two of the best-known and most influential of these Jewish authors.

Secular

Secular literature in this period was not produced in equal quantity as religious literature. The earliest tales are based on oral traditions: the British Y Gododdin and Preiddeu Annwfn, along with the Germanic Beowulf and Nibelungenlied. They relate to myths or certain 6th-century events, but the surviving manuscripts date from centuries later—Y Gododdin from the late 13th century, Preiddu Annwfn from the early 14th century, Beowulf from c. 1000, and the Nibelungenlied from the 13th century. The makers and performers were bards (British/Welsh) and scops (Germanic), elite professionals attached to royal or noble courts to praise the heroes of legendary history.

Prose tales first emerged in Britain: the intricate Four Branches of the Mabinogi about princely families, notably anti-war in theme, and the romantic adventure Culhwch and Olwen. (The Mabinogi is not the same as the Mabinogion, a collection of disconnected prose tales, which does, however, include both the Mabinogi and Culhwch and Olwen.) These works were compiled from earlier oral tradition c. 1100.

At about the same time a new poetry of "courtly love" became fashionable in Europe. Traveling singers—troubadours and trouvères—made a living from their love songs in French, Spanish, Galician-Portuguese, Catalan, Provençal, and Greek. Germanic culture had its  Minnesänger tradition. The songs of courtly love often express unrequited longing for an ideal woman, but there are also aubades (dawn farewells by lovers) and humorous ditties.

Following the earliest epic poems, prose tales, and romances, more long poems were crafted—the chansons de geste of the late 11th and early 12th centuries. These extolled conquests, as in The Song of Roland (part of the Matter of France) and Digenis Acritas (one of the Acritic songs). The rather different chivalric romance tradition concerns adventures about marvels, love, and chivalry. They tell of the Matter of Britain and the Matter of Rome.

Political poetry threads throughout the period from the very early Armes Prydein (10th-century Britain) to the goliard rebels of 12th and 13th centuries, who were church trained clerics unable or unwilling to be employed in the church.

Travel literature was highly popular in the Middle Ages, as fantastic accounts of far-off lands (frequently embellished or entirely false) entertained a society that supported sea voyages and trading along coasts and rivers, as well as pilgrimages to such destinations as Jerusalem; Canterbury and Glastonbury in England; St. David's in Wales; and Santiago de Compostela in Spain. Geoffrey Chaucer's Canterbury Tales became popular at the end of the 14th century.

The most prominent authors of Jewish secular poetry in the Middle Ages were Solomon ibn Gabirol and Yehuda Halevi, both of whom were also renowned religious poets.

Women's literature
While it is true that women in the medieval period were never accorded full equality with men, some women were able to use their skill with the written word to gain renown.  Religious writing was the easiest avenue—women who would later be canonized as saints frequently published their reflections, revelations, and prayers.  Much of what is known about women in the Middle Ages is known from the works of nuns such as Clare of Assisi, Bridget of Sweden, and Catherine of Siena.

Frequently, however, the religious perspectives of women were held to be unorthodox by those in power, and the mystical visions of such authors as Julian of Norwich, Mechthild of Magdeburg, and Hildegard of Bingen provide insight into a part of the medieval experience less comfortable for the institutions that ruled Europe at the time.  Women wrote influential texts in the secular realm as well—reflections on courtly love and society by Marie de France and Christine de Pizan continue to be studied for their glimpses of medieval society.

Some women were patrons of books and owners of significant book collections. Female book collectors in the fifteenth century included Alice Chaucer, Duchess of Suffolk; Cecily Neville, Duchess of York; and Lady Margaret Beaufort, Countess of Richmond and Derby. Lady Margaret Beaufort may also have completed translations as a testament to her piety, as Bishop Father John Fisher noted in a sermon dedicated to her after her death.

For modern historical reflection, D.H. Green's (2007) historical work entitled, Women Readers of the Middle Ages explores literacy and literature in terms of women in medieval society. The book has been reviewed as "a radical reassessment of women's contribution to medieval literary culture."

Allegory

While medieval literature makes use of many literary devices, allegory is so prominent in this period as to deserve special mention.  Much of medieval literature relied on allegory to convey the morals the author had in mind while writing—representations of abstract qualities, events, and institutions are thick in much of the literature of this time. Probably the earliest and most influential allegory is the Psychomachia (Battle of Souls) by Aurelius Clemens Prudentius. Other important examples include the Romance of the Rose, Everyman, Piers Plowman, the Roman de Fauvel, and the Divine Comedy.

Preservation 
A recent study has concluded that only about 68 percent of all medieval works have survived to the present day, including fewer than 40 percent of English works, around 50 percent of Dutch and French works, and more than three quarters of German, Icelandic, and Irish works.

Notable literature of the period

Alexiad, Anna Comnena
Beowulf, anonymous Anglo-Saxon author
Caedmon's Hymn
Cantigas de Santa Maria, Galician 
The Book of the City of Ladies, Christine de Pizan
Book of the Civilized Man, Daniel of Beccles
The Book of Good Love, Juan Ruiz
The Book of Margery Kempe, Margery Kempe
Brut, Layamon
Brut, Wace
The Canterbury Tales, Geoffrey Chaucer
Consolation of Philosophy, Boethius
David of Sassoun, anonymous Armenian author
Decameron, Giovanni Boccaccio
The Dialogue, Catherine of Siena
Digenis Acritas, anonymous Greek author
The Diseases of Women, Trotula of Salerno
La divina commedia (The Divine Comedy), Dante Alighieri
Dukus Horant, the first extended work in Yiddish.
Elder Edda, various Icelandic authors
Das fließende Licht der Gottheit, Mechthild of Magdeburg
First Grammatical Treatise, 12th-century work on Old Norse phonology
Gesta Danorum, Saxo Grammaticus
Heimskringla, Snorri Sturluson
Historia ecclesiastica gentis Anglorum (The Ecclesiastical History of the English People), the Venerable Bede
Holy Cross Sermons, anonymous Polish author
The Knight in the Panther's Skin, Shota Rustaveli
The Lais of Marie de France, Marie de France
The Letters of Abelard and Heloise
Libro de los ejemplos del conde Lucanor y de Patronio (Book of the Examples of Count Lucanor and of Patronio), Don Juan Manuel, Prince of Villena
Ludus de Antichristo, anonymous German author
Mabinogion, various Welsh authors
Metrical Dindshenchas, Irish onomastic poems
Il milione (The Travels of Marco Polo), Marco Polo
Le Morte d'Arthur, Sir Thomas Malory
Nibelungenlied, anonymous German author
Njál's saga, anonymous Icelandic author
Parzival, Wolfram von Eschenbach
Piers Plowman, William Langland
Poem of the Cid, anonymous Spanish author
Proslogium, Anselm of Canterbury
Queste del Saint Graal (The Quest of the Holy Grail), anonymous French author
Revelations of Divine Love, Julian of Norwich
Le Roman de Perceforest
Roman de la Rose, Guillaume de Lorris and Jean de Meun
Sadko, anonymous Russian author
Scivias, Hildegard of Bingen
Sic et Non, Abelard
Sir Gawain and the Green Knight, anonymous English author
The Song of Roland, anonymous French author
Spiritual Exercises, Gertrude the Great
Summa Theologiae, Thomas Aquinas
Táin Bó Cúailnge, anonymous Irish author
The Tale of Igor's Campaign, anonymous Russian author
Tirant lo Blanc, Joanot Martorell
The Travels of Sir John Mandeville, John Mandeville
Tristan, Thomas d'Angleterre
Tristan, Béroul
Tristan, Gottfried von Strassburg
Troilus and Criseyde, Geoffrey Chaucer
Waltharius
Younger Edda, Snorri Sturluson
Yvain: The Knight of the Lion, Chrétien de Troyes

Specific articles

By region or language

Anglo-Norman literature
Classical Arabic literature
Medieval Armenian literature
Medieval Bosnian literature
Old Breton literature
Byzantine literature
Medieval Bulgarian literature
Medieval Catalan literature
Medieval Croatian literature
Old and Middle Dutch literature
Old English literature
Middle English literature
Early English Jewish literature
Medieval French literature
Sicilian School
Old High German literature
Middle High German literature
Medieval Georgian literature
Medieval Hebrew literature
Icelandic literature
Medieval Irish literature
Medieval Italian literature
Medieval Latin literature
Latin translations of the 12th century
Occitan literature
Old Norse literature
Pahlavi literature
Medieval Persian literature
Medieval Portuguese literature
Medieval Serbian literature
Medieval Scottish literature
Medieval Spanish literature
Medieval Welsh literature

By genre
Medieval poetry
Medieval drama
Medieval allegory
Medieval mysticism
Fabliau
Medieval travel literature
Arthurian literature
Alexander romances
Chanson de geste
Chivalric romance
Eddic poetry
Skaldic poetry
Alliterative verse
Miracle plays
Morality plays
Mystery plays
Passion plays

By period
Early Medieval literature (6th to 9th centuries)
10th century in literature
11th century in literature
12th century in literature
13th century in literature
14th century in literature

References

External links
The Medieval and Classical Literature Library
The Labyrinth: Resources for Medieval Studies
The Internet Medieval Sourcebook Project
Medieval and Renaissance manuscripts, Vulgates, Books of Hours, Medicinal Texts and more, 12 - 17th century, Center for Digital Initiatives, University of Vermont Libraries
Luminarium: Anthology of Middle English Literature
Medieval Nordic Literature at the Icelandic Saga Database

 
03
Literature